Condition Red may refer to:
 Condition Red (film), a 1995 Finnish-American thriller film 
 Condition Red (comics), the name of two different American comic book characters

Music
 Condition Red (Red Rockers album), 1981
 Condition Red (Iron Savior album), 2002
 "Condition Red" (The Goodees song), 1968 one-hit wonder song